Med Reventberg, full name Inga Margaretha Ida Reventberg (7 June 1948 – 23 June 2021) was a Swedish actress, short film director, and theatre manager.

She was born in Nyköping. In the 1970s, she was a member of the leftist theater and music group Nationalteatern. After being active in several other Swedish theatres, she headed the Västerbotten theatre from 2005 on.

Med Reventberg appeared in many Swedish films and television productions, mostly in minor roles.

Reventberg died on 23 June 2021, at the age of 73.

References

External links

1948 births
2021 deaths
Swedish stage actresses
Swedish film directors
Swedish theatre managers and producers
People from Nyköping Municipality
Swedish film actresses
Swedish television actresses
Swedish women film directors
Women theatre managers and producers
20th-century Swedish actresses
21st-century Swedish actresses